The National Minorities Party is a political party in India, working amongst the Muslim minority community. The president of the party is Rajya Sabha member Akhtar Hasan Rizvi.

Political parties in India
Political parties of minorities